John Norman Ellis OBE (22 February 1939 – 28 February 2011) was a British trade union leader.

Born in the Osmondthorpe area of Leeds, Ellis attended the Leeds College of Commerce before finding work delivering mail for the Post Office.  In 1958, he moved to the Ministry of Public Building and Works, where he worked as a clerk, and became active in the Civil and Public Services Association (CPSA).

In 1968, Ellis was appointed as the full-time assistant secretary of the CPSA, holding the post until 1982, when he became the union's deputy general secretary.  In 1986, he was elected as general secretary, and from 1988 also served on the General Council of the Trades Union Congress.  In 1992, he stood down from his existing posts to become secretary of the Council of Civil Service Unions, also joining the Industrial Tribunal Panel.

Ellis retired in 1995, thereafter devoting his time to the Civil Service Pensioners' Alliance, and the Labour Party, which he represented on Caterham Valley Parish Council. He was appointed OBE in the 1995 Birthday Honours.

References

1939 births
2011 deaths
Councillors in Surrey
Labour Party (UK) councillors
General Secretaries of the Civil and Public Services Association
Members of the General Council of the Trades Union Congress
Officers of the Order of the British Empire
Politicians from Leeds